The Welsh uprising of 1211 was a rebellion by several Welsh princes, orchestrated by Llywelyn ap Iorwerth with primary support from Gwenwynwyn of Powys, Maelgwn ap Rhys, Madog ap Gruffydd Maelor and Maredudd ap Robert against King John of England.  Although technically defeated, this uprising resulted in increased independence from England for the Welsh.

Background
In the Norman conquest of 1066, the Norman army of William the Conqueror conquered England, and English earldoms of Chester, Shrewsbury, and Hereford were created on England's border with Wales.  These strategic political centres served as key points in military action against the Welsh.  Despite the strategic advantage these areas gave the Normans, only one Welsh kingdom fell under Norman control during William's reign: the southeast Kingdom of Gwent.

By 1100, Norman lords control included Brecon, Cardigan, Glamorgan and Pembroke.  This led to the establishment of the March of Wales, an area previously ruled by Welsh kings.

The Welsh resisted Norman and Anglo-Saxon control in the twelfth century.  The kingdoms of Deheubarth, Gwynedd and Powys, became a firmly established base for Welsh statehood.  Aberffraw (Gwynedd), Dinefwr (Deheubarth), and Mathrafal (Powys) had become the centers of Welsh culture and politics.  The establishment of these kingdoms started a period of stability and growth for the Welsh, including flourishing agriculture, scholarship and Welsh literature.  The Welsh lacked strength as an entity, however, because although allies, the Welsh kings ruled separately, and swore allegiance to England's crown.

The uprising
The end of the twelfth century marked a period of political unrest due to the contested succession following the deaths of the three Welsh kings.  Several factions fought for control of the region.  Deheubarth and Powys never did return to stability, but Gwynedd was once again united under the reign of Llywelyn ap Iorwerth (Llywelyn Fawr, the Great), following a rather brief power struggle.

King John was unsettled by the new power gained by Llywelyn, and so he led a military campaign against him which led to Llywelyn's defeat in 1211.  Llywelyn, although humiliated, did secure the allegiance of other Welsh leaders, since the Welsh feared total subjugation under King John.  Llywelyn led Welsh forces through continued conflict with King John, and successfully united the Welsh politically.  The result was John and Llywelyn reached an agreement and a peace treaty was signed in July 1211, but only after Joan, Lady of Wales, Llywelyn's wife, who was also the illegitimate daughter of King John intervened as a diplomat for her husband .  This provided for minimal involvement by the king of England in Welsh affairs.

Bibliography
 Caradoc of Llancarvan; Williams, John, ''Brut y Tywysogion or The Chronicle of the Welsh Princes." Longman and Roberts, London, 1860, p. 271.

References

 everyculture.com
 timeref.com

John, King of England
Conflicts in 1211
1211 in Wales
13th-century rebellions
Medieval rebellions in Europe